Onkar Khanvilkar (born 8 September 1982) is an Indian first-class cricketer who represented Mumbai. He made his first-class debut for Mumbai in the 2003-04 Ranji Trophy on 23 November 2003.

References

External links
 

1982 births
Living people
Indian cricketers
Mumbai cricketers